The Auster J/4 was a 1940s British single-engined two-seat high-wing touring monoplane built by Auster Aircraft Limited at Rearsby, Leicestershire.

History
Sales in the United Kingdom of the American-engined Auster J/2 Arrow were limited by import restrictions on the engines, so Auster re-engined the aircraft with a British engine, the 90 hp Blackburn Cirrus Minor I. The first aircraft flew towards the end of 1946. The two-seat aircraft proved less popular than the companies three-seat Auster J/1 Autocrat and only 27 aircraft were built. A number of aircraft were exported to Australia and these were known as the Archer in that country.

Two J4 airframes (G-AIPH & G-AIJT) were modified with Continental O-200 engines in the late 1960s by the Rolls-Royce employees “Merlin Flying Club”. G-AIJT remains airworthy. 

On 30 August 1955 an Australian aircraft VH-AET managed to take-off from Bankstown Airport Sydney without a pilot. It was followed out to sea by Royal Australian Navy Hawker Sea Furies and shot down.

Specifications (J/4)

See also

References

1940s British civil utility aircraft
Auster aircraft
Single-engined tractor aircraft
High-wing aircraft
Aircraft first flown in 1946